Zemfira Talgatovna Ramazanova (born 26 August 1976) is a Russian rock musician. She has been performing since 1998 and has been popular in Russia and other former Soviet republics. To date Zemfira has sold over 3 million records.

Biography
An ethnic Volga Tatar, she was born in a typical middle-class family – her mother is a doctor, and her father is a history teacher. At the age of 4, Zemfira became interested in music and entered a music school the following year (where she studied piano performance and voice) and writing her first song when she was seven years old. Her older brother Ramil introduced her to rock music, which became her real passion – she listened to Black Sabbath, Nazareth and Queen, learning to play the guitar. In the 7th grade, Zemfira split her time between music and basketball, becoming the captain of the Russian Girls’ Junior Basketball Team by 1990. She began to lose interest in classical music, preferring instead to hang out with friends in the streets of Ufa and covering songs by Russian rock groups such as Kino, Nautilus Pompilius and Aquarium (who reached the peak of their popularity in the early 1990s).

At the urging of her mother, Zemfira continued with piano studies and graduated music school with honors. In her last year of high school, basketball competed with school work, and the singer abandoned the sport in favour of music. She took the entrance exams for the Ufa College of Fine Arts and was admitted into the second year, studying vocal performance. During college, she performed jazz and rock and roll standards in various local bars and restaurants accompanied by her friend, saxophone player Vlad Kolchin. She graduated with honors, and in 1996 took a job as a sound engineer at the Ufa subsidiary of the radio station "Europe Plus".

For the next couple of years Zemfira spent her days making advertisement recordings at the station and her nights on a computer, where she recorded the songs that would later become the singles "Why" (Почему), "Snow" (Снег), and "Weatherman" (Синоптик). In early 1998, Zemfira invited Rinat Akhmadiyev, Sergei Sozinov, Sergei Mirolyubov, and Vadim Solovyov to join Zemfira. Their first professional gig took place on 19 June 1999 as part of a festival celebrating the anniversary of a local radio station Silver Rain Ufa. Shortly after Zemfira sent out promo tapes to multiple Moscow producers, one of whom (Ilya Lagutenko from Mumiy Troll) was smitten with the material, and invited the band for some sessions in Moscow.

Career

1999–2005
Recording and production work on the debut album took place at Mosfilm Moscow until 10 May 1999, when the debut was finally released. The promotion of Zemfira prior to the release included heavy rotation of singles "AIDS" (СПИД), "Arrivederci" (Aриведерчи), and "Rockets" (Ракеты) as well as the video clips for those songs. The band immediately went on tour, starting a tradition of celebrating their beginnings with a summer concert in Ufa while recording their second album Forgive Me My Love (Прости Меня Моя Любовь). The group enjoyed popularity from the start, in part because of heavy rotation on radio and television, and in part because a female rocker is a fairly rare and unusual concept for the Russian music scene (which to this day is dominated by scantily-clad female pop singers).

After the release of PMML (Russian abbreviation for Forgive Me My Love) in March 2000, what can only be described as “Zemfiromania” swept the country. "Searching" (Искала) and "Ripe" (Созрела) became instant hits, and the group was invited to headline the festival Maxidrom. Constant touring wore down on the band, and after the release of 14 Weeks of Silence the band took a break.

In September 2004, Zemfira began studies towards a degree in Philosophy at Moscow State University, but after the first semester she took a sabbatical and did not resume her studies thereafter. On 16 October on the MTV Russia Awards show the singer performed "We Are the Champions" together with the rock group Queen.

The fourth studio album, Vendetta, which consists of 15 tracks, was released on 1 March 2005. The recording became a result of Zemfira's collaboration with several musicians: Igor Vdovin, Korney, Vlad Kreymer, Yuri Tsaler and Oleg Pungin. Primarily the album was going to be named "Oil", but the title was changed few days before the official release. "Vendetta" got many positive reviews.

2007–present
On 14 February 2007, a collection of music videos Zemfira.DVD was released. It contains all the singer's clips, except AIDS and Traffic.

In May and June 2007, Zemfira embarked on a short concert tour titled 'Déjà Vu', with performances held in smaller venues (clubs and small theatres). The tour culminated with a Moscow performance at the Green Theatre which was filmed by Renata Litvinova. The tour program focused on stylish remakes of the singer's top hits, often reworked in styles such as jazz, ska, bossa nova, and blues. A new album, Thank You (Спасибо), was released at the beginning of October. It is described by Zemfira herself as 'very positive', in contrast to what she terms the 'restlessness' of Vendetta.

The concert movie Green Theatre in Zemfira, which mixes Zemfira's monologues with selected songs shot during her live performance at the open air show in Moscow, was released in several Russian digital movie theatres on 21 February 2008. Later it was also released on DVD and Blu-ray.

The final concert in support of Thank You was staged on 1 April 2008 at the Olimpiysky stadium in Moscow; some journalists considered it as the best performance in her career. Later in June Zemfira was awarded an independent Steppenwolf prize established by a musical critic Artemy Troitsky. She won in two categories: The Best Performance (for the Olimpiysky show) and The Best Album (Thank You). The movie-concert Green Theatre in Zemfira by Litvinova was named the best musical movie of the year.

On 21 March 2009, an album of b-sides Z-Sides leaked into the net.

In June 2010, Zemfira wrote on her official website: "vacation is over" and announced a mini-tour in support of a deluxe-edition of her first three albums (Zemfira, PMML and 14 Weeks of Silence). On 1 August she performed a set of 4 songs on the closing concert of a pop-music contest New Wave. It was her first performance since January 2009. The arrangements of this set were used in the mini-tour in September that included 5 cities: Saint-Petersburg, Yekaterinburg, Minsk, Kyiv and Moscow. Critics admitted that her old songs became more rhythmic and resembled demo-versions due to the new minimalistic style of arrangements. In October Zemfira took part in two tribute concerts "20 Years without KINO" in Moscow and Saint-Petersburg that were dedicated to the memory of Viktor Tsoi. Her gig of four covers on Tsoi's songs was seen by some journalists as the most noticeable performance in the program.

On New Year's Eve 2011, the video version of two Moscow concerts staged in Crocus City Hall and Strelka Institute in September 2010 was broadcast on Dozhd' (Rain) TV channel. The video was directed by Renata Litvinova. Then the singer informed her fans that the release of her sixth album had moved to Fall 2011. The first single No Chance (Bez shansov) was presented on Nashe Radio on 15 April. During the next three months she gave three performances: on 28 May Zemfira took part in the international rock festival Maxidrom along with The Prodigy, Adam Lambert, Korn, Brainstorm and other artists; then she became a Russian headliner of a Muz-TV Awards ceremony show at Olimpiysky stadium on 3 June; on 23 July Zemfira performed at the Afisha Picnic outdoor festival in Moscow as the Russian headliner of the main stage. During that gig she presented a new song called "Money". At her April 2013 concert in Kyiv, she was joined by several leading figures of Ukrainian showbusiness on stage, including Svyatoslav Vakarchuk. She offended some audience members by comparing Kyiv to Moscow, in that she had to work hard, rather than Odessa and St Petersburg where the crowd do the work.

In July 2015, Zemfira unfurled Ukraine's national flag at a concert in the Georgian capital of Tbilisi, drawing criticism from Russian media, while several promoters in Russia abandoned their plans to include her in their programs. However, in 2016, in a concert in Lithuania, Zemfira demanded the audience to remove a huge Ukrainian flag that was unfolded by fans. She said, "I'm Russian, we're in Lithuania. I'm asking you, get rid of that flag. Whilst you love your country, I love mine."

In February 2016, during her "Little Man" (Маленький человек) tour Zemfira announced that she would stop touring, which was misrepresented in the media as her abandoning musical performance altogether. Musical critic Troitsky commented that while he does not doubt that the announcement was made in earnest, he believed that since Zemfira is an emotional person, she may change her decision later. , the "Little Man" tour continues in North America.

On 6 September 2020, Zemfira performed as a headliner at the Stereoleto festival in St. Petersburg.

In 2021, Zemfira's music video "остин (Austin)", directed by Alexey Krupnik, was the overall winner of the Berlin Music Video Awards, while it also won the award for the Best Concept category.

During the 2022 Russian invasion of Ukraine, officially forbidden to be called a war in Russia, her website featured only the statement "нет войне" ("no to war"). Though she performed a concert in Moscow on the day the invasion began, she was reported to have left the country. On 21 March, she released an anti-war music video to her 2017 song "Don’t Shoot", while also removing all of her other songs from her YouTube channel. The video contained footage of Russia’s military assault on Ukraine and of anti-war protests in Moscow. She is currently residing with her partner, Renata Litvinova, in Paris. In February 2023, the Russian government placed Zemfira in its list of "foreign agents".

Discography

Albums
Zemfira (Земфира) (1999)
Forgive Me My Love (Прости Меня Моя Любовь) (2000)
14 Weeks of Silence (14 Недель Тишины) (2002)
Vendetta (Вендетта) (2005)
Zemfira.Live (2006)
Thank You (Спасибо) (2007)
Z-Sides (2009)
Zemfira.Live2 (2010)
To Live in Your Head (Жить в твоей голове) (2013)
A small man. Live (Маленький Человек . Live) (2016)
Borderline (Бордерлайн) (2021)

Singles
 "Snow" (Снег (Sneg)) (1999)
 "Goodbye" (До Свидания (Do svidania)) (2000)
 "Traffic" (Трафик (Trafik)) (2001)
 "10 Boys" (10 мальчиков (10 mal'chikov)) (2008)
 "No Chance" (Без шансов (Bez shansov)) (2011)
 "Money" (Деньги (Den'gi)) (2012)
 "Coffeewine" (Кофевино (Kofevino)) (2013)
 "Joseph" (Джозеф) (2018)
 "Crimea" (Крым) (2020)

Filmography
 Goddess: How I Fell In Love (Богиня: Как я полюбила) (2004)
 Green Theater in Zemfira (Зелёный театр в Земфире) (2008)
 Moscow. Crocus/Strelka (Москва.Крокус/Стрелка) (2010)

Awards and nominations
MTV Europe Music Awards

|-
| 2001
| rowspan=4|Herself
| rowspan=3|Best Russian Act
| 
|-
| 2005
| 
|-
| rowspan=2|2013
| 
|-
| Best Eastern European Act
| 
Russian National Music Awards

|-
| 2015
| Herself
| Best Rock Artist
| 

Muz-TV Awards

!Ref.
|-
| rowspan=2|2003
| 14 Недель Тишины
| Best Album 
| 
| rowspan=2|
|-
| "Бесконечность"
| Best Song
| 
|-
| 2005
| rowspan=2|Herself
| rowspan=2|Best Female Act
| 
| 
|-
| rowspan=2|2006
| 
| rowspan=2|
|-
| Вендетта
| Best Album
| 
|-
| rowspan=5|2008
| Herself
| Best Female Act 
| 
| rowspan=5|
|-
| Tour
| Best Show
| 
|-
| Спасибо
| Best Album
| 
|-
| rowspan=2|"Мы разбиваемся"
| Best Song
| 
|-
| Best Video
| 
|-
| 2012
| rowspan=4|Herself
| Best Female Act of Decade
| 
| 
|-
| 2014
| rowspan=2|Best Female Act
| 
| 
|-
| rowspan=2|2016
| 
| rowspan=2|
|-
| Best Rock Act
| 
|-
| 2017
| "Жить в твоей голове"
| Best Song of 15 Years
| 
| 

Zolotaya Pchela

!Ref.
|-
| 2005
| Herself
| Artist of the Year
| 
| 

Berlin Music Video Awards

References

External links

 
 YouTube channel
 An article on Zemfira from 2000
 Zemfira lyrics translated in English and other languages
 Zemfira at Forbes.ru
 

1976 births
Living people
21st-century Russian women singers
21st-century Russian singers
Musicians from Ufa
Tatar people of Russia
MTV Europe Music Award winners
Russian pop singers
Russian rock singers
Russian women composers
Russian women singer-songwriters
Tatar musicians
Russian LGBT entertainers
Russian activists against the 2022 Russian invasion of Ukraine
People listed in Russia as foreign agents
Indie rock musicians